Horne Glacier is a valley glacier,  long, draining southwest from the Everett Range in Victoria Land, Antarctica. The glacier lies directly between Mount Works and Mount Calvin before entering the lower part of Greenwell Glacier. It was first mapped by the United States Geological Survey from surveys and U.S. Navy air photos, 1960–62, and was named by the Advisory Committee on Antarctic Names for Lieutenant Robert P. Horne, U.S. Navy Reserve, pilot of C-130 aircraft on photographic flights in Operation Deep Freeze 1968 and 1969. This glacier lies situated on the Pennell Coast, a portion of Antarctica lying between Cape Williams and Cape Adare.

References

Glaciers of Pennell Coast